The 2nd Kuwaiti Federation Cup started on September 7, 2008.

The Second Federation Cup is one of four competitions in the Kuwaiti 2008/2009 season. 14 clubs are taking part in the tournament.

They were divided into two groups of seven, and the winner and runner-up of each group will advance to the semi-finals.

The cup is used as a curtain raiser to the Kuwaiti Premier League season.

Group A

Final Standings:

Group B
Final Standings:

Semi-finals

Final

External links 
 goalzz.com - Kuwaiti Federation Cup

Kuwait Federation Cup
Kuwait Federation Cup, 2008-09
2008–09 domestic association football cups

ar:كأس الإتحاد الكويتي 2007/2008